Haryana Lokhit Party (abbreviated as HLP) is an Indian political party in the state of Haryana. The party was founded by leader Gopal Kanda on 2 May 2014. HLP was an alternative to the existing political system, and his party would work to end dynastic politics, casteism, and regionalism in politics and work for the development of the state.

References

External links 

Political parties in India